Raccordo autostradale 3 (RA 3), managed by ANAS, is a branch of the Autostrada A1 which connects the Tuscan city of Florence with the city of Siena with a total route of approximately 56 kilometres.

The siding was opened in 1964.

References 

RA03
Transport in Tuscany